Olalekan Olude is a Nigerian entrepreneur, the co-founder of Jobberman, West Africa's most popular job search engine and Special Adviser on Job Creation and Youth Empowerment to Ogun state Governor Dapo Abiodun. 

Olude was named as one of the 100 Most Influential Young Nigerians by Avance Media in 2016.

Educational background 

Olude  is from Imasayi in Yewa North Local Government in Ogun State; he started his education at Iganmode Grammar School, Ota, between 1993 and 1999 where he obtained his Senior School Leaving Certificate. He proceeded to Obafemi Awolowo University where he earned a Bachelor of Science (Hons) in Computer Science between 2005 and 2009. He also attended Lagos Business School and University of Pennsylvania.

Career 
Before Jobberman, Olude had few experiences working with TeleMobile Nigeria Limited as Network Engineer and NameGoldman Sachs as Technology Analyst. In August 2009, at 28 years old he co-founded Jobberman with Ayodeji Adewunmi and Opeyemi Awoyemi.  Olude presently is Jobberman's Chief Operating Officer.

References 

Living people
Web developers
Nigerian technology businesspeople
Yoruba businesspeople
21st-century Nigerian businesspeople
Businesspeople from Ogun State
Nigerian company founders
Obafemi Awolowo University alumni
Year of birth missing (living people)
Chief operating officers